Events from the year 1714 in art.

Events
 Antoine Coypel becomes director of the Académie de peinture et de sculpture.

Paintings
 Charles Jervas – Portrait of Alexander Pope
 Sir Godfrey Kneller – Portrait of Robert Harley as Lord High Treasurer
Nicolas de Largilliere - Portrait of a lady as Pomona, traditionally identified as the Marquise de Parabère
 Johann Michael Rottmayr – Coronation of Our Lady (fresco on dome of St. Peter's Church, Vienna)

Births
 January 21 – Anna Morandi Manzolini, Bolognese sculptor in wax (died 1774)
 January 26 – Jean-Baptiste Pigalle, French sculptor (died 1785)
 March 6 – Jean-Baptiste Marie Pierre, French painter, drawer and administrator (died 1789)
 March 25 – Friedrich Christian Glume, German sculptor (died 1752)
 August 1 – Richard Wilson, landscape painter (died 1782)
 August 14 – Claude Joseph Vernet, French painter (died 1789)
 August 28 – Jean-Baptiste Descamps, French writer and painter of village scenes (died 1791)
 November – Pierre-François Brice, Belgian painter (died 1794)
 date unknown
 Philippe Caffieri, French sculptor (died 1774)
 Étienne Fessard, French engraver (died 1774)
 Thomas Johnson, English wood carver and furniture maker (died 1778)
 Robert Taylor, English stonemason, sculptor and architect (died 1788)

Deaths
 April 28 – Jean-Jacques Clérion, French sculptor (born 1637)
 May – Andreas Schlüter, German sculptor and architect in the Petrine Baroque style (born 1664)
 May 11 – Pierre Le Gros the Elder, French sculptor for the Versailles (born 1629)
 August 20 – Cristóbal de Villalpando, Mexican painter  (born 1649)
 October 4 – Peter Strudel, Austrian sculptor and painter (born 1660)
 November 2 – Giuseppe Passeri, Italian painter, active in his native city of Rome (born 1654)
 December 15 – Giovanni Monevi, Italian painter (born 1637)
 date unknown
 Niccolò Cassana, Venetian portrait painter working in London (born 1659)
 Giovanni Battista Cimaroli, Italian painter of landscapes (born 1653)
 Filippo Maria Galletti, Italian painter of religious works and a Theatine priest (born 1636)
 Gennaro Greco, Italian, also known as "Il Mascacotta", veduta painter (born 1663)

References

 
Years of the 18th century in art
1710s in art